The Governor of Gagauzia, (Başkan), is the highest political position in Gagauzia, an autonomous territorial unit of Moldova. They chair the Executive Committee of Gagauzia and are an ex-officio member of the Cabinet of Moldova.

The position is created by the 14th article of the law on the legal status of Gagauzia No. 344-XIII (December 23, 1994). All state authorities in Gagauzia are subordinate to the Governor. The governor is elected by universal, equal, direct, secret and free suffrage on an alternative basis for a term of 4 years. One and the same person can be a governor for no more than two consecutive terms. They must be a citizen of Moldova over 35 years old and know the Gagauz language. The governor can issue decisions and decrees valid throughout the territory of Gagauzia.

Governors of Gagauzia

See also
Cabinet of Moldova
President of Moldova

External links 
 gagauzia.md

 

Lists of Moldovan politicians
Gagauzia
Political office-holders in Moldova